CPC Corporation FC was a Taiwanese professional football club which last competed in the Taiwan Football Premier League. It was named after the main sponsor, the CPC Corporation.

History
The team is a founder of the Taiwan Football Challenge League, participating in the league's inaugural season, and winning the 2020 Challenge League title in their first attempt. The next season, now debuting in the first division, they finished at the 6th place, escaping the relegation risk by table position. However, they withdrew in 2022, supposedly due to changes in its internal business strategy.

2021 squad

References

Football clubs in Taiwan
Works association football clubs in Taiwan